Hyrcanogobius bergi, the Volga dwarf goby, is a species of goby endemic to the Caspian Sea where it occurs in fresh, brackish and marine waters along the coast.  Unusually for gobies, this species is almost a pelagic fish.  This species grows to a length of  SL.  This species is the only known member of its genus. The specific name honours the Soviet zoologist Lev Berg (1876-1950) who described many new species of goby from the Caspian Sea.

References

Gobiidae
Fish of the Caspian Sea
Monotypic fish genera
Fish described in 1928